Harlequin snake may refer to:

 Agkistrodon contortrix mokasen, the northern copperhead, a venomous viper found in the eastern United States
 Micrurus fulvius, the eastern coral snake, a venomous elapid found in the eastern United States
 Micrurus tener, the Texas coral snake, a venomous elapid found in the southern United States and northern/central Mexico

Animal common name disambiguation pages